Pures Leben ("Pure Life") is the thirteenth studio album by German singer Thomas Anders. It was released by the Warner Music Group on 7 April 2017. Produced by Christian Geller, it peaked at number 14 on the German albums chart.

Track listing
All tracks produced by Christian Geller.

Charts

Release history

References

2017 albums
Thomas Anders albums
Warner Music Group albums